"Damn Drunk" is a song written by Liz Hengber, Alex Kline and Ben Stennis and recorded by American country music artist Ronnie Dunn as a duet with Kix Brooks, one half of Brooks & Dunn. It was released in August 2016 as the second single from Dunn's third studio album Tattooed Heart. 

Although the song is credited as Ronnie Dunn with Kix Brooks, this became the first new Brooks & Dunn song since the 2009 single "Honky Tonk Stomp".

Chart performance

References

2016 songs
2016 singles
Ronnie Dunn songs
Kix Brooks songs
Male vocal duets
Songs written by Liz Hengber
Songs written by Ben Stennis
Big Machine Records singles